The men's slalom at the 1952 Winter Olympics was held on Tuesday 19 February at Rødkleiva ski run. The course was very difficult to maintain as the weather was not favorable.  The men's course had 52 gates.  Since the men's race was scheduled the day before the women's, and there was concern about the condition of the hill, the number of racers was reduced after the first run in compliance with international rules.  Twenty-nine athletes finished both runs.  Four athletes were disqualified after the first run.  Austrian Othmar Schneider won his second Olympic medal, this time gold, after he took the silver in the downhill competition.  Norwegians Stein Eriksen and Guttorm Berge placed second and third respectively.

Results
Tuesday, 19 February 1952

* 5 seconds penalty added.

Source:

See also

 1956 Winter Olympics

Notes

References
 

Men's alpine skiing at the 1952 Winter Olympics